George Vincent Rhoden (born 13 December 1926) is a Jamaican retired athlete, winner of two Olympic gold medals in 1952.

Rhoden was born in Kingston in December 1926. He later moved to San Francisco, California, and was one of the successful long sprinters from Jamaica in the late 1940s and early 1950s, along with Arthur Wint and Herb McKenley. He competed in the 1948 Summer Olympics, but did not win a medal, being eliminated in the heats of the 100 m and the semi-final of the 400 m. He was also a member of the heavily favoured Jamaican 4 × 400 m relay team, but when Wint pulled a muscle in the final, their chances at a medal were gone. On 22 August 1950 at Eskilstuna, Sweden, Rhoden set a new world record in 400 m of 45.8 s. He was a member of Alpha Phi Alpha fraternity.

At the 1952 Summer Olympics in Helsinki, Rhoden was more successful. As a world record holder he was one of the pre-race favourites in the 400 m which he won in a close battle with his compatriot McKenley, who had also been second in the 1948 Olympic 400 m. As the anchor runner of the Jamaican relay team, Rhoden added a second Olympic gold, edging the United States by a tenth of a second, and setting a new world record (3:03.9).

Competition record

References 

1926 births
Living people
Sportspeople from Kingston, Jamaica
Morgan State Bears men's track and field athletes
Jamaican male sprinters
World record setters in athletics (track and field)
Athletes (track and field) at the 1948 Summer Olympics
Athletes (track and field) at the 1952 Summer Olympics
Olympic athletes of Jamaica
Olympic gold medalists for Jamaica
Medalists at the 1952 Summer Olympics
Olympic gold medalists in athletics (track and field)
Central American and Caribbean Games gold medalists for Jamaica
Competitors at the 1946 Central American and Caribbean Games
Competitors at the 1950 Central American and Caribbean Games
Competitors at the 1954 Central American and Caribbean Games
Central American and Caribbean Games medalists in athletics